Temozón Municipality (in the Yucatec Maya language: “Place of the swirl”) is one of the 106 subdivisions of the State of Yucatán in Mexico. Its municipal seat is located in the City of Temozón.

Location
This municipality is located in the eastern region of the state.  It is between latitudes 20° 48 'and 20° 57' north and longitudes 87° 47' and 88 ° 16' west.

Its northern border is Calotmul - Tizimín, to the south is Valladolid, on the east Chemax and the west Espita and Uayma.

Communities
The municipality is made up of 99 different communities, of which the most important are:

 Temozón (Municipal Center)
 Hunuku
 Nahbalam
 Yokdzonot Presentado
 Santa Rita

Landmarks

Architectural
San Roman Church, built during the colonial period (probably in the eighteenth century). The church of San Antonio de Padua, and the municipal building.

Archeological
Ek' Balam

References

Municipalities of Yucatán